The Hejaz railway (also spelled Hedjaz or Hijaz;) was a narrow-gauge railway ( track gauge) that ran from Damascus to Medina, through the Hejaz region of modern day Saudi Arabia, with a branch line to Haifa on the Mediterranean Sea. It was a part of the Ottoman railway network and the original goal was to extend the line from the Haydarpaşa Terminal in Kadıköy, Istanbul beyond Damascus to the holy city of Mecca. However, construction was interrupted due to the outbreak of World War I, and it reached only to Medina,  short of Mecca.

The main purpose of the railway was to establish a connection between Istanbul, the capital of the Ottoman Empire and the seat of the Islamic Caliphate, and Hejaz in Arabia, the site of the holiest shrines of Islam and the holy city of Mecca, the destination of the Hajj annual pilgrimage. Other objectives were to improve the economic and political integration of the distant Arabian provinces into the Ottoman state, and to facilitate the transportation of military forces.

History

Construction 

Railways were experiencing a building boom in the late 1860s, and the Hejaz region was one of the many areas up for speculation. The first such proposal involved a railway stretching from Damascus to the Red Sea. This plan was soon dashed however, as the Amir of Mecca raised objections regarding the sustainability of his own camel transportation project should the line be constructed. Ottoman involvement in the creation of a railway began with Colonel Ahmed Reshid Pasha, who, after surveying the region on an expedition to Yemen in 1871–1873, concluded that the only feasible means of transport for Ottoman soldiers traveling there was by rail.  Other Ottoman officers, such as Osman Nuri Pasha, also offered up proposals for a railway in the Hejaz, arguing its necessity if security in the Arabian region were to be maintained.

Many around the world did not believe that the Ottoman Empire would be able to fund such a project: it was estimated the railway would cost around 4 million Turkish lira, a sizeable portion of the budget.  The Ziraat Bankasi, a state bank which served agricultural interests in the Ottoman Empire, provided an initial loan of 100,000 lira in 1900.  This initial loan allowed the project to commence later the same year.  Abdulhamid II called on all Muslims in the world to make donations to the construction of the Hejaz Railway.  The project had taken on a new significance.  Not only was the railway to be considered an important military feature for the region, it was also a religious symbol.  Hajis, pilgrims on their way to the holy city of Mecca, often didn't reach their destination when travelling along the Hejaz route.  Unable to contend with the tough, mountainous conditions, up to 20% of hajis died on the way.  Abdulhamid was adamant that the railway stand as a symbol for Muslim power and solidarity: this rail line would make the religious pilgrimage easier not only for Ottomans, but all Muslims. As a result, no foreign investment in the project was to be accepted.  The Donation Commission was established to organize the funds effectively, and medallions were given out to donors.  Despite propaganda efforts such as railway greeting cards, only about 1 in 10 donations came from Muslims outside of the Ottoman Empire.  One of these donors, however, was Muhammad Inshaullah, a wealthy Punjabi newspaper editor.  He helped to establish the Hejaz Railway Central Committee.

Access to resources was a significant stumbling block during construction of the Hejaz Railway. Water, fuel, and labor were particularly difficult to find in the more remote reaches of the Hejaz. In the uninhabited areas, camel transportation was employed not only for water, but also food and building materials. Fuel, mostly in the form of coal, was brought in from surrounding countries and stored in Haifa and Damascus. Labor was certainly the largest obstacle in the construction of the railway. In the more populated areas, much of the labor was fulfilled by local settlers as well as Muslims in the area, who were legally obliged to lend their hands to the construction. This labor was largely employed in the treacherous excavation efforts involved in railway construction. In the more remote areas the railway would be reaching, a more novel solution was put to use. Much of this work was completed by railway troops of soldiers, who in exchange for their railway work, were exempt from one third of their military service.   As the rail line traversed treacherous terrain, many bridges and overpasses had to be built. Since access to concrete was limited, many of these overpasses were made of carved stone and stand to this day.

The Emir Hussein bin Ali, Sharif of Mecca viewed the railway as a threat to Arab suzerainty, since it provided the Ottomans with easy access to their garrisons in Hejaz, Asir, and Yemen. From its outset, the railway was the target of attacks by local Arab tribes. These were never particularly successful, but neither were the Turks able to control areas more than a mile or so either side of the line. Due to the locals' habit of pulling up wooden sleepers to fuel their camp-fires, some sections of the track were laid on iron sleepers.

In September 1907, as crowds celebrated the rail reaching Al-'Ula station, a rebellion organized by the tribe of Harb threatened to halt progress. The rebels objected to the railway stretching all the way to Mecca; they feared they would lose their livelihood as camel transport was made obsolete. It was later decided by Abdulhamid that the railway would only go so far as Medina.

Under the supervision of chief engineer Mouktar Bey, the railway reached Medina on 1 September 1908, the anniversary of the Sultan's accession. However, many compromises had to be made in order to finish by this date, with some sections of track being laid on temporary embankments across wadis. In 1913 the Hejaz Railway Station was opened in central Damascus as the starting point of the line.

World War I 

To fuel locomotives operating on the railway during World War I, the German Army produced shale oil from the Yarmouk oil shale deposit.  The Turks constructed a military railway from the Hejaz line to Beersheba, opening on 30 October 1915.

The Hejaz line was repeatedly attacked and damaged, particularly during the Arab Revolt, when Ottoman trains were ambushed by the guerrilla force led by T. E. Lawrence.  
 On 26 March 1917, T. E. Lawrence (known as Lawrence of Arabia) led an attack on the Aba el Naam Station, taking 30 prisoners and inflicting 70 casualties on the garrison.  He went on to say, "Traffic was held up for three days of repair and investigation.  So we did not wholly fail."

 In May 1917, British bombers dropped bombs on Al-'Ula Station. In July 1917, Stewart Newcombe, a British engineer and associate of Lawrence, conspired with forces from the Egyptian and Indian armies to sabotage the railway. The Al-Akhdhar station was attacked and 20 Turkish soldiers were captured.

 In October 1917, the Ottoman stronghold of Tabuk fell to Arab rebels. The Abu-Anna’em station was also captured.

 In November 1917, Sharif Abdullah and the tribe of Harb attacked Al-Bwair station and destroyed two locomotives.

 In December 1917, a group of men led by Ibn Ghusiab derailed a train on the line south of Tabuk.
With the Arab Revolt and the dissolution of the Ottoman Empire, it was unclear to whom the railway should belong.  The area was divided between the British and the French, both eager to assume control.  However, following years of neglected maintenance, many sections of track fell into disrepair; the railway was effectively abandoned by 1920.  In 1924, when Ibn Saud took control of the peninsula, plans to revive the railway were no longer on the agenda.

World War II 
In the second world war, the Samakh Line (from Haifa to Deraa at the Syrian border and to Damascus) was operated for the Allied forces by the New Zealand Railway Group 17th ROC, from Afula (with workshops at Deraa and Haifa). The locomotives were 1914 Borsig and 1917 Hartmann models from Germany. The line, which had been operated by the Vichy French, was in disrepair. Trains over the steep section between Samakh (now Ma'agan) and Derea were 230 tons maximum, with 1,000 tons moved in 24 hours. The group also ran 60 miles (95 km) of branch line, including Afula to Tulkarm.

The 1960s 
The railway south of the modern Jordanian–Saudi Arabian border remained closed after the fall of the Ottoman Empire in 1920. An attempt was made to rebuild it in the mid-1960s, but then abandoned due to the Six-Day War in 1967.

Current status 

Two connected sections of the Hejaz railway are in service:

 from Amman in Jordan to Damascus in Syria, as the Hedjaz Jordan Railway, and 
 from phosphate mines near Ma'an to the Gulf of Aqaba, as the Chemin de Fer de Hedjaz Syrie, or the Aqaba Railway

Saudi Arabia completed the construction of the Medina-Mecca line (via Jeddah) with the Haramain high-speed railway in 2018.

Workers on the railway have restored many of the original locomotives: there are nine steam locomotives in Syria and seven in Jordan in working order. Since the accession of King Abdullah II, relations between Jordan and Syria have improved, causing a revival of interest in the railway. The train runs from Qadam station in the outskirts of Damascus, not from the Hejaz Station, which closed in 2004, pending a major commercial development project. On 4 February 2009 the Turkish Transport Minister Binali Yildirim said in Riyadh that Turkey planned to rebuild its section, and called on Saudi Arabia, Jordan and Syria to come together and complete the restoration.

Small non-operating sections of the railway track, buildings and rolling stock are still preserved as tourist attractions in Saudi Arabia, including the Medina Terminus, restored in 2005 with railway tracks and locomotive shed. The old railway bridge over the  Aqiq Valley though was demolished in 2005 due to damage from heavy rain the year before. Trains destroyed during the Arab Revolt of 1916–1918 can still be seen where they fell.

Israel Railways partially rebuilt the long-defunct Haifa extension, the Jezreel Valley railway, using standard gauge, with the possibility of someday extending it to Irbid in Jordan. The rebuilt line opened from Haifa to Beit She'an in October 2016.

In 2009, Jordan's transport ministry proposed a 990-mile (1590-km) US$5 billion rail network, construction of which could begin in the first quarter of 2012. The planned network would provide freight rail links from Jordan to Syria, Saudi Arabia and Iraq. Passenger rail connections could be extended to Lebanon, Turkey and beyond. The government, which will fund part of the project, is inviting tenders from private firms to raise the rest of the project cost.

In 2008, the "museum of the rolling stock of Al-Hejaz railway" opened in Damascus' Khadam station after major renovations for an exhibition of the locomotives. Trains run from Khadam station on demand (usually from German, British or Swiss groups). The northern part of the Zabadani track is no longer accessible. There is a small railway museum at the station in Mada'in Saleh and a larger project in the "Hejaz Railway Museum" in Medina, which opened in 2006.

In November 2018, Middle East Monitor revealed Saudi-Israel's joint plans to revive the railway from Haifa to Riyadh.

Image gallery

See also

 Arab Mashreq International Railway, planned network in the eastern part of the Arab world
 Haramain high-speed railway (built 2009-2018) between Mecca and Medina
 Baghdad Railway (built 1903-1940), initially a German-Ottoman project
 Similar gauges
 Transport in Jordan
 Transport in the Arab League
Ottoman Palestine railways
 Eastern Railway, Ottoman WWI line, Tulkarm to Hadera and Tulkarm to Lydda; connected to Jezreel Valley, Jaffa–Jerusalem, and Beersheba lines
 Jaffa–Jerusalem railway (inaugurated 1892)
 Railway to Beersheba or the 'Egyptian Branch', Ottoman WWI line headed towards the Suez Canal; two lines: (Lidda–) Wadi Surar–Beit Hanoun, and Wadi Surar–Beersheba
Mandate Palestine & Israel railways
 Palestine Railways, government-owned company and rail monopolist in Mandate Palestine (1920-1948)
 Rail transport in Israel
 Coastal railway line, Israel, main line in Mandate Palestine and Israel
 Israel Railways, the state-owned principal railway company in Israel

References

Further reading 

 
 
 Judd, Brendon The Desert Railway: The New Zealand Railway Group in North Africa and the Middle East during the Second World War (2003, 2004 Auckland, Penguin) 
 Özyüksel, Murat The Hejaz Railway and the Ottoman Empire: Modernity, Industrialisation and Ottoman Decline (Bloomsbury Publishing, 2014).

External links 

 Four podcasts about the Hejaz railway from BBC World service
 pictures and report of travelogue in the Saudi Section of Hejaz railway
 BBC: "A piece of railway history"
 BBC: "Pilgrim railway back on track"
 http://www.hejaz-railroad.info/Galerie.html
 Many pictures from the Hidjaz Railway stations from a 2008 trip across Syria
 Extensive website on the Hejaz railway
 Yarmuk River railway bridges, 1933 aerial photographs. Aerial Photographic Archive for Archaeology in the Middle East / National Archives, London.
 Hejaz railway overlay on Google Maps

 
1050 mm gauge railways
1900 establishments in the Ottoman Empire
History of Hejaz
International railway lines
Medina
Ottoman railways
Railway lines in Israel
Railway lines in Jordan
Railway lines in Saudi Arabia
Railway lines in Syria
Railway lines opened in 1908